Quercus gambelii, with the common name Gambel oak, is a deciduous small tree or large shrub that is widespread in the foothills and lower mountains of western North America. It is also regionally called scrub oak, oak brush, and white oak.

The common and scientific names, Gambel oak and Quercus gambelii, were named after the American naturalist William Gambel (1821–1849).

Description

Quercus gambelii trees differ in size from one location to another. The largest trees are found in the southern range of the species along streams. These trees reach up to 100 feet tall.

Although the wood is hard and dense, its branches are irregular and crooked, making them flexible enough to bend without breaking when covered with heavy snow. The bark is rough and brownish-gray.

Leaves frequently turn orange and yellow during autumn, creating mountainsides of vivid colors. The flowers are inconspicuous unisexual catkins that occur in the spring.

The plant reproduces from acorns, but also spreads from root sprouts that grow from vast underground structures called lignotubers. These reproductive characteristics often result in dense groves or thickets of trees that can cover entire mountainsides.

Distribution and habitat 
The natural range of Quercus gambelii is centered in the western United States and northwestern Mexico in the states of Arizona, Chihuahua, Colorado, New Mexico, Sonora, and Utah. It also extends into Nevada, Wyoming, Idaho, Nebraska, the Oklahoma Panhandle, Coahuila, and into the Trans-Pecos region of western Texas.

The species flourishes in full sun on hillsides with thin, rocky, alkaline soil where competition from other plant species is limited. It also does well in richer soils, but in those areas it is forced to compete for growing room. It is well-adapted to locations where wet springs and hot, dry summers create conditions conducive to wildfires.

Ecology 
After a fire, Gambel oak quickly re-establishes from root sprouts. The plant is drought tolerant.

Associated plant species include: chokecherry, arrowleaf balsamroot, bigtooth maple, mountain mahogany, ponderosa pine, and serviceberry. Associated birds and mammals include Woodhouse's scrub jay, black-billed magpie, grouse, deer, chipmunks and squirrels.

Where abundant, Gambel oak is an important food source for browsing animals such as deer and livestock. The sweetish acorns are frequently gathered by squirrels and stored for winter food. Acorns are also eaten by wild turkeys, black bears, and domestic animals such as hogs. Some insects depend on the Gambel oak: for example, the Colorado hairstreak butterfly uses it as a food source for caterpillars.

Uses
Historically, acorns from Gambel oak provided a reliable source of food for Native Americans. If bitter, tannins can be leached from the acorns.

References

External links

photo of herbarium specimen at Missouri Botanical Garden, collected in the Mexican State of Nuevo México (present-day US State of New Mexico) in 1847

gambelii
Trees of the Western United States
Trees of Northwestern Mexico
Flora of the Rocky Mountains
Flora of Arizona
Flora of Colorado
Flora of New Mexico
Flora of Utah
Plants described in 1848
Taxa named by Thomas Nuttall
Plants used in Native American cuisine
Flora of the Sierra Madre Occidental
Oaks of Mexico